The Gumpert Nathalie or RG Nathalie is a hydrogen-electric hybrid sports car running on methanol to generate hydrogen that is scheduled to enter production in 2021. It is the first car produced by the new car manufacturer RG founded by Roland Gumpert, following the bankruptcy of his company Gumpert which produced the Apollo. Production is planned to be limited to 500 cars.

History

Preamble 
Roland Gumpert is a former president of Audi Sport. In 2001, he had founded the automobile manufacturer Gumpert, to produce a supercar named Gumpert Apollo. In 2014, the company went bankrupt, and was taken over by Hong Kong businessman Norman Choi and consortium Consolidated Ideal TeamVenture, the owner of De Tomaso, which renames it Apollo Automobil Gmbh and produces the Apollo Intensa Emozione.

Presentation 
In 2017, Roland Gumpert joined forces with Aiways, a Chinese company based in Shanghai and specialist in alternative energies, and founded his new company called “RG”, initials of Roland Gumpert, based in Ingolstadt in Germany.

At Beijing Motor Show 2018, RG presents the prototype of its first model: the "Nathalie", named after the daughter of the founder. The RG Nathalie is to be produced at 500 copies from the end of 2019 in Germany, then in Shangrao in China and sold at a price of 420000 Euros.

At the 2019 Geneva Motor Show, Gumpert presents the RG Nathalie in its series version, produced from 2021, with its electric motor powered by a fuel cell.

Features 
The Nathalie is a two-seater coupe, its line is close to the Nissan GT-R. It receives headlights with LEDs at the front, removable shutters and a light strip joining the rear lights.

They develop a combined power of  transmitted on all four wheels.

The Nathalie is equipped with a  fuel cell which operates on methanol and supplies a  battery. The complex system developed by RG consists of a methanol reformer which, by a catalyzed chemical reaction, divides methanol into carbon dioxide and hydrogen, the latter feeding the fuel cell which produces electricity. The fuel cell system type is indicated by the fuel cell producer as Reformed methanol fuel cell. It also increases its autonomy thanks to the recovery of energy produced during braking. If renewable methanol (e.g. made of municipal waste or renewable electricity) is used, a carbon-neutral operation is possible.

See also 

 Reformed methanol fuel cell

References

External links 

 Official Website

Cars of China
Cars of Germany
All-wheel-drive vehicles
Coupés
Fuel cell vehicles
Hybrid electric cars
Sports cars
Cars introduced in 2018